SS Deutschland was a 21,046 gross registered ton (GRT) German HAPAG ocean liner which was sunk in a British air attack on May 3, 1945. Before the sinking, between April 16 and 28 1945, the concentraion camp of Neuengamme was systematically emptied of all its remaining prisoners, other groups of concentration camp inmates and Soviet POWs; with the intention that they would be relocated to a secret new camp. In the interim, they were to be concealed from the advancing British and Canadian forces; and for this purpose the SS assembled a prison flotilla of decommissioned ships in the Bay of Lübeck, consisting of the liners Cap Arcona and Deutschland, the freighter Thielbek, and the motor launch Athen [de]. Since the steering motors were out of use in Thielbek and the turbines were out of use in Cap Arcona, Athen was used to transfer prisoners from Lübeck to the larger ships and between ships;[14] they were locked below decks and in the holds, and denied food and medical attention. All people on board the Deutschland survived the attack, though two accompanying vessels sank with great loss of life.

Commissioning
One of a group of four ships that included the SS Albert Ballin, SS Hamburg, and SS New York, the Deutschland was launched on 28 April 1923. She began her maiden voyage on 27 March 1924, to Southampton and then on to New York City. The turbine-powered ship had a speed of 14.5 knots; she was later re-engined with larger-geared turbines in 1929, with service speed increased to 19 knots. This gave the ship a seven-day passage across the Atlantic.

On 11 November 1933, Deutschland collided with the American cargo ship  in New York Harbor. Munargo suffered severe damage and was beached north of Bedloe's Island, but was refloated on 18 November 1933.

Second World War
In 1940, Deutschland became an accommodation ship for the German Navy at Gotenhafen. In 1945, on seven Baltic voyages as part of Operation Hannibal, she carried 70,000 refugees from the German eastern territories to the west.

Sinking
In April 1945, she began being converted into a hospital ship. An attempt was made to paint the vessel white, but there was only sufficient paint available to paint her funnels white, and to paint a Red Cross on one side of one of her funnels. During the first days of May 1945, thousands of concentraion camp inmates were locked below decks and in the holds, and denied food and medical attention.All people on board the Deutschland survived the attack, though two accompanying vessels sank with great loss of life.Subsequently, on 3 May 1945, she was attacked by British RAF squadrons three times, and capsized and sank in the Bay of Lübeck off Neustadt, but everyone aboard survived. A fourth British air attack that day sank the SS Cap Arcona and the Thielbek, with great loss of life.

In 1949, the wreck was raised and scrapped.

See also

 List of maritime disasters

Footnotes

References

Ships of the Hamburg America Line
Cruise ships of Germany
Maritime incidents in 1933
Hospital ships in World War II
World War II shipwrecks in the Baltic Sea
Military scandals
Maritime incidents in May 1945
Troop ships of Germany
Steamships of Germany
The Holocaust
Deportation
1945 in Germany
1923 ships
Ships built in Hamburg
Ships sunk by British aircraft
Ships sunk with no fatalities